Bust a Groove is a hybrid music/fighting video game for the Sony PlayStation released in 1998. The game was developed by Metro and published by Enix in Japan, brought to the U.S. by 989 Studios and to Europe by Sony Computer Entertainment Europe.

One of the first rhythm games to follow in the wake of PaRappa the Rappers unexpected popularity, the game combined PaRappa the Rapper-inspired rhythm-based gameplay with elements of fighting games, including special moves designed to damage the opponent and head-to-head competitive play. The Japanese version is titled , but in all other regions it was released as Bust-A-Groove, to avoid a trademark conflict with the Japanese puzzle game Puzzle Bobble, which was released in North America and Europe as Bust-A-Move.

The sequel, Bust a Groove 2, unlike its predecessor, wasn't planned to be released in Europe, and Dance Summit 2001, the third game in the series, was released only in Japan on the PlayStation 2.

Gameplay
The game play revolves around the beat of the music playing, displaying arrows that correspond to directions on the D-Pad, as well as the symbols for the circle and X button. By every fourth beat of the song, the player must match the commands on the screen, causing their character to complete a dance move, or else it is considered a miss. When the player performs a combo of eight dance moves, advanced paths with more complex moves allows the player to earn more points.

The player also uses a "Jammer" as an attack to interrupt rivals, which can also be dodged by a somersault move. This was used by pressing the square button by causing the player to do the back flip, and avoid the "Jammer".

Characters

Main

Hidden

Songs
 Frida - Sora to Umi to Niji no Yume (空と海と虹の夢)
 Translation: "Dreams Of The Sky, Sea, and Rainboww"
 Gas-O - CHEMICAL LOVE
 Hamm/Burger Dog - I luv hamburgers
 Heat - 2 BAD
 Hiro - The Natural Playboy
 Kelly - Transform
 Kitty N - Aozora no KNIFE (Bust a Move Edit) (青空のknife)†
 Translation: "The Blue Sky Knife"
 NA Release - Bust A Groove
 Pinky - I know
 Shorty/Columbo - Waratte pon (笑ってぽん)
 Translation: "Cracking Smiles"
 NA Release - Shorty & the EZ Mouse
 Strike - Power
 Capoeira - Uwasa no KAPOERA (噂のカポエラ)
 Translation: "The Rumoring Capoeira"
 NA Release - CAPOEIRA
 Robo-Z - FLYIN'TO YOUR SOUL

† In addition to the song, there was an instrumental version—in which titled "blue knife (start G move mix)" from the soundtrack—was used for the opening cutscene for the game. There is also a different version, calling it "blue knife dream (orchestra stall mix)", it was used for the staff credits.

Release

In Japan a premium version was released containing a "premium disc" with four movies. Accomplishing certain tasks in the game unlocks certain movies. One of the movies features Hatsumi Morinaga, the artist responsible for singing the theme of Kitty-N's stage. This feature contains shots of the artist singing the song in the studio, an interview with the artist, and a live-action version of the game, with costumed Japanese dancers taking the parts of the various characters. The other three movies contained within the disc were all for other Enix games: Astronōka, Star Ocean: The Second Story, and Hello Charlie (released as Eggs of Steel in the U.S.). The premium version is otherwise identical to the game-only version.

The following changes were made in the English localization of the game:

 Hiro's cigarette smoking was removed.
 Hamm's general appearance was changed from a ganguro into a Caucasian.
 In Hamm's song, "McDonald's, Burger King, or any other place" was replaced with "Hamburger lovers, let me hear you say ho" and the word "nigga" was removed.
 A line in Strike's song referring to alcohol was removed, leaving an instrumental break following the line "Like Arnold Schwarzenegger, I'm the only true Eraser".
 During gameplay, Strike drinks from a hip flask in the Japanese version. This was changed to a can of soda pop.
 The songs "Waratte PON", "Aozora no KNIFE", "Uwasa no KAPOEIRA" and "Transform" were translated to English and re-recorded. The first three were retitled "Shorty and the EZ mouse", "Bust a Groove" and "Capoeira", respectively.

Bust a Groove: Arcade Edition
An arcade edition of Bust a Groove, although released only in Japan, held the title of Bust a Groove. The controls are the same as the PlayStation version but the controller is significantly different. The player now has to press the giant Left, Up and Right buttons in a giant pad and step on a footpedal for the 'Down' command while the action buttons (Square, X etc.), are replaced by a giant "Dance!" button. The buttons also have to be pressed in a rhythmic manner or still be counted as a "miss". A Jammer button is also included.

The arcade version features only five stages (Robo-Zs stage always being the last one).

Reception

PlayStation
Hyper magazine reviewed the PlayStation game and gave it a 91% score. Next Generation reviewed the PlayStation version, rating it four stars out of five, and stated that "Bust-A-Move is definitely an idea whose time has come, and it helps bridge the gap between hardcore gaming and mass culture appeal. It doesn't hurt that it's also a serious blast to play." Next Generation also reviewed the U.S. PlayStation version, rating it four stars out of five, and stated that "Overwhelmingly infectious tunes that have been translated to English for the U.S., hordes of secret dancers, and stages, charming touches such as secondary animations in stages for players who execute tough movies, and a clever, though not entirely unique, concept make Bust-A-Groove a game that deserves to find an audience in the U.S."

Arcade
In Japan, Game Machine listed Bust a Groove on their April 1, 1999 issue as being the third most-successful dedicated arcade game of the month.

References

External links

Bust a Groove at GameRankings

1998 video games
Arcade video games
Dance video games
Enix games
Music video games
PlayStation (console) games
Sony Interactive Entertainment games
Square Enix franchises
Video games developed in Japan
Multiplayer and single-player video games
Atlus games
Namco games
Fighting games